Sophie Lang Goes West is a 1937 American crime film directed by Charles Reisner, written by Frederick Irving Anderson, Doris Anderson, Brian Marlow and Robert Wyler, and starring Gertrude Michael, Lee Bowman, Sandra Storme, Buster Crabbe, Barlowe Borland, C. Henry Gordon and Jed Prouty. It was released on September 10, 1937, by Paramount Pictures.

Sophie Lang Goes West is the third and last film of the Sophie Lang series, after The Notorious Sophie Lang (1934), and The Return of Sophie Lang (1936).

Cast
 Gertrude Michael as Sophie Lang
 Lee Bowman as Eddie Rollyn
 Sandra Storme as Helga Roma
 Buster Crabbe as Steve Clayson 
 Barlowe Borland as Archie Banks
 C. Henry Gordon as Sultan of Padaya
 Jed Prouty as J.H. Blaine
 Rafael Storm as Laj 
 Fred Miller as Policeman
 Herbert Ransom as Policeman
 Nick Lukats as Taxi Driver
 Guy Usher as Police Inspector Parr
 Archie Twitchell as Clerk
 Robert Cummings as Curley Griffin
 Ralph McCullough as  Hotel Clerk

References

External links 
 

1937 films
American crime films
1937 crime films
Paramount Pictures films
Films directed by Charles Reisner
American black-and-white films
1930s English-language films
1930s American films